Roscoe "Rocky" Carroll (born July 8, 1963) is an American actor and director. He is known for his roles as Joey Emerson on the Fox comedy-drama Roc (1991–94), as Dr. Keith Wilkes on the CBS medical drama Chicago Hope, and as NCIS Director Leon Vance on the CBS drama NCIS and its spinoffs Los Angeles and New Orleans.  He also played a supporting role in the 1995 thriller film Crimson Tide.

Early life
Carroll was born Roscoe Carroll in Cincinnati, Ohio, on July 8, 1963. His acting career is rooted in the theater. In 1981, Carroll graduated from the famed School for Creative and Performing Arts (SCPA)  in Cincinnati Ohio, in the Cincinnati Public School District. Determined to further his knowledge of acting, he attended The Conservatory of Theatre Arts at Webster University in St. Louis, where he graduated with a B.F.A. degree. Carroll would later receive an honorary degree from his alma mater in 2009. After graduating, Carroll decided to test the waters by moving to New York City, the heart of the theater community. There, he introduced many young children to the works of William Shakespeare by participating in Joe Papp's "Shakespeare on Broadway" series.

Career
As part of Joe Papp's acclaimed New York Shakespeare Festival, Carroll helped to open doors for actors of color, by taking on non-traditional roles that were rarely portrayed by Black actors in Shakespeare dramas. In 1987, Carroll was introduced to the works of August Wilson. The up-and-coming and talented young actor was allowed to recreate his role for the Broadway production of Wilson's critically acclaimed story The Piano Lesson. The play not only earned a Pulitzer Prize for Drama, but Carroll earned a Tony and Drama Desk nomination.

He is known for portraying ne'er-do-well musician Joey Emerson on the FOX comedy-drama Roc. He also had a starring role as Dr. Keith Wilkes in the TV series Chicago Hope. Carroll has guest starred in several other TV programs including The Agency, Boston Legal, Family Law, The West Wing, Law & Order, The Game, ER and Grey's Anatomy. Carroll has had roles in many Hollywood films such as Born on the Fourth of July, The Ladies Man, Crimson Tide, The Great White Hype, Prelude to a Kiss, The Chase, Best Laid Plans and Yes Man.

In the fifth season of the CBS drama NCIS, Carroll was featured in a recurring role as Assistant Director Leon Vance. In doing so, he had been reunited with his Chicago Hope castmates Mark Harmon and Lauren Holly. After the death of NCIS director Jenny Shepard (played by Holly), his character became the new director of NCIS, and replaced Holly in the main cast. He has also guest-starred as Vance in the NCIS spin-offs Los Angeles and New Orleans.

He shares his birthday with former NCIS co-star Michael Weatherly.

In addition to being a series regular on NCIS, Carroll has also directed fifteen episodes of NCIS, making his directorial debut with the Season 12 episode, "We Build, We Fight".

Personal life
Carroll married Gabrielle Bullock in 1996. They have one daughter, Elissa.

Filmography

Film

Television

Video games

Director

References

External links
 
 
 Rocky Carroll at the NCIS cast page of CBS.com

1963 births
Living people
Male actors from Cincinnati
African-American male actors
American male film actors
American male stage actors
American male Shakespearean actors
American male television actors
American male voice actors
Webster University alumni
21st-century American male actors
20th-century American male actors